Dave Hendrickson (born c. 1949) is a former American football coach. He served as the head football coach at Mayville State University in Mayville, North Dakota in 1989 and Minot State University—in Minot, North Dakota from 1990 to 1999, compiling a career college football record of 61–44.

A native of Rugby, North Dakota, Hendrickson attended Valley City State University in Valley City, North Dakota, lettering in football and baseball. He began his coaching career at Minnewaukan High School in Minnewaukan, North Dakota, where he coached football, basketball, and baseball. 1974, he was appointed head football coach at Hettinger High School in Hettinger, North Dakota.

Head coaching record

College

References

1940s births
Year of birth missing (living people)
Living people
Mayville State Comets football coaches
Minot State Beavers football coaches
North Dakota Fighting Hawks football coaches
Valley City State Vikings baseball players
Valley City State Vikings football players
High school basketball coaches in North Dakota
High school football coaches in North Dakota
High school football coaches in South Dakota
High school baseball coaches in the United States
People from Rugby, North Dakota
Coaches of American football from North Dakota
Players of American football from North Dakota
Baseball players from North Dakota
Baseball coaches from North Dakota
Basketball coaches from North Dakota